Born to Kvetch: Yiddish Language and Culture in All Its Moods'Born to Kvetch (Audio CD).  is a 2005 book by Michael Wex devoted to Yiddish. In this book, "Wex is a rare combination of Jewish comic and scholarly cultural analyst".

The book became a New York Times Bestseller and was followed by a Yiddish phrasebook Just Say Nu. 

The book is about cultural and religious influences in Yiddish language, and how the Jewish worldview is reflected in Yiddish, putting the main focus on Yiddish as a language of opposition (or "language of aggravation, of exile and alienation" as Allan Nadler puts it) during their life in diaspora often within hostile cultures. The Yiddish word "kvetch" in the book title means "to complain", "to whine", expressing Wex's idea that Yiddish is the language of complaint, which is rooted in the millennia of Jewish exile. William Grimes in his review of the book quotes it: "Judaism is defined by exile, and exile without complaint is tourism". Other flavors of Yiddish associated with  the first one noted by Wex is that it is the language of dispute (influence of the tradition of Talmudic commentary) and the language is rich in insults, curses and other unpleasant things. As Wex wittingly notes: "A simple kvetch''  is a descriptive activity that conveys disapproval... a 'knole' (curse), on the other hand, is a 'kvetch' with a mission".

The book received an honourable mention from the ALA in the Sophie Brody Award 2006.

Kvetch means to squeeze or press in Yiddish. In the United States it has come to mean complain.

References

Linguistics books
Yiddish culture
Yiddish
Books about Jews and Judaism
2005 non-fiction books